Bebel García García (1914 – 29 July 1936) was a Spanish football player and politician from Galicia. 

He was executed on 29 July 1936, minutes after the Spanish coup of July 1936. He was honoured by Eduardo Galeano in his poem Espejos, una historia casi universal. His last request was to urinate on his executioners.

He played as defender for Deportivo de La Coruña from 1933 to 1936 on Segunda División and he scored 11 goals in 28 matches.

His brother France was also executed and his other brother Jaurés was incarcerated because he was underage.

References

Bibliography
 

1914 births
1936 deaths
Deportivo de La Coruña players
Victims of the White Terror (Spain)
Footballers from Galicia (Spain)
People from A Mariña Oriental
Sportspeople from the Province of Lugo
Male murder victims
People executed by Spain by firing squad
Spanish casualties of the Spanish Civil War
Spanish people of the Spanish Civil War (Republican faction)
Spanish footballers
Association football defenders
People killed in the Spanish Civil War